Chanochi is a Korean dish. It is pink, pan-fried tteok (rice cake) or jeonbyeong (pancake) made with glutinous rice flour. It is a regional dish of the Yeongnam region.

Etymology 
Chanochi is a compound of the prefix cha- and the noun nochi. Cha- means "glutinous", and nochi is a Gyeongsang dialect word for noti, which is a pan-fried tteok (rice cake) made with glutinous proso millet and yeot-gireum (barley malt powder), and usually considered a regional dish of Kwansŏ region.

Preparation 
Rice flour is seasoned with salt, dyed pink using purple gromwell, and kneaded with boiling water. The dough is rolled into flat, round pieces and pan-fried in oil. Pan-fried chanochi is coated with honey or sugar.

See also 
 Hwajeon

References 

Glutinous rice dishes
Tteok